Cole Moore (born June 3, 1997) is an American professional stock car racing driver. He competes full-time in the ARCA Menards Series West, driving the No. 99 Chevrolet SS for Bill McAnally Racing, and part-time in the ARCA Menards Series, driving the No. 99 Chevrolet SS for Bill McAnally Racing. He is the son of John Moore.

Racing career

ARCA Menards Series West 
Moore made his NASCAR K&N Pro Series West (now the ARCA Menards Series West) debut in 2015, running four races at the All-American Speedway, his home-track located in Roseville, California, with Bill McAnally Racing. He finished 19th. Moore ran 6 races the following year at the Colorado National Speedway, Stateline Speedway, Evergreen Speedway, Utah Motorsports Campus (2), and the All-American Speedway. His best finish was 7th at Roseville. Moore ran one race in 2017, finishing 7th at Roseville. Moore did not run again until 2021. Moore went full-time with Bill McAnally Racing in 2021. Moore collected 6 top tens and 4 top fives. Moore led 114 laps, including 79 at Roseville. His best finishes were 4th at both the Sonoma Raceway and Colorado National Speedway.
Moore was the 2021 ARCA Menards Series West rookie of the year.

ARCA Menards Series 
Moore made his ARCA Menards Series debut, running in the race's paired event with the West Series at the Phoenix Raceway. Moore finished 12th.

Motorsports career results

ARCA Menards Series

ARCA Menards Series West

References

External links 

1997 births
Living people
ARCA Menards Series drivers
NASCAR drivers
Racing drivers from California
Sportspeople from California